Kyriacos (Kerry) Tsolakis (born 23 January 1948 in Agros) is a Cypriot architect and politician. He serves as Honorary President of the Repatriated Cypriots of Australia. Having moved to Australia in 1972, Kyriacos became a key figure in the Cypriot diaspora and repatriated Cypriot communities of Australia, founding the Cyprus Hellenic Club of Melbourne  and serving as vice-president of the Federation of Cyprus Hellenic Associations of Australia for ten years.

The Cypriot Diaspora in Melbourne 
In parallel to his architectural career, Tsolakis served as President of the Cyprus Hellenic Club for ten years and Secretary of the Coordinated Committee for Justice in Cyprus (SEKA), both of which he was a founding member. This was during a period which witnessed the Turkish invasion of Cyprus and the social and economic aftermath as well as a large relocation of Cypriots overseas. During the 1980s, Tsolakis helped the Cypriot banking industry set up in Melbourne, namely Cyprus Popular Bank and Bank of Cyprus.

The Repatriated Cypriot Community 
Upon his return to Cyprus in 1993, Tsolakis became President of Association of Repatriated Cypriots of Australia. In 1997, Kyriacos organized one of the first bi-communal meetings between Turkish Cypriot and Greek Cypriot repatriates at the Nicosia Airport in the UN Buffer Zone, under the auspices of the UN Civil Police Force and the Australian High Commission.

A personal friend of the late President of the Republic of Cyprus Glafcos Clerides, Kyriacos has worked closely with many presidents in his role including Spyros Kyprianou, Tassos Papadopoulos, George Vasiliou and Demetris Christofias.

Architectural career 
In Melbourne, Kyriacos founded his architectural practice K. Tsolakis & Associates Architects Pty Ltd and the construction company T.K.S Design & Construction Pty Ltd. During the 70’s and 80’s the practice went on to win a number of notable competitions in Melbourne with a project list totalling 520. Together with his children, they have set up their architectural practice, Kyriacos Tsolakis Architects, based in Nicosia and London.

Personal life 
Kyriacos has been married to Angela Raftopoulos since 1980, daughter of the philanthropist Stathis Raftopoulos, MBE; businessman, poet and co-owner of the Greek Cinemas of Melbourne. They have three children, Elena, Nicodemos and Cassandra who are all architects.

References

Architects from Melbourne
1948 births
Living people
Cypriot emigrants to Australia